Senator Kitchen may refer to:

Bethuel Kitchen (1812–1895), West Virginia State Senate
Derek Kitchen (born 1988), Utah State Senate
Shirley Kitchen (born 1946), Pennsylvania State Senate